Aluminium bronze is a type of bronze in which aluminium is the main alloying metal added to copper, in contrast to standard bronze (copper and tin) or brass (copper and zinc). A variety of aluminium bronzes of differing compositions have found industrial use, with most ranging from 5% to 11% aluminium by weight, the remaining mass being copper; other alloying agents such as iron, nickel, manganese, and silicon are also sometimes added to aluminium bronzes.

Compositions

The following table lists the most common standard aluminium bronze wrought alloy compositions, by ISO 428 designations. The percentages show the proportional composition of the alloy by weight. Copper is the remainder by weight and is not listed:

Material properties
Aluminium bronzes are most valued for their higher strength and corrosion resistance as compared to other bronze alloys.  These alloys are tarnish-resistant and show low rates of corrosion in atmospheric conditions, low oxidation rates at high temperatures, and low reactivity with sulfurous compounds and other exhaust products of combustion.  They are also resistant to corrosion in sea water. Aluminium bronzes' resistance to corrosion results from the aluminium in the alloys, which reacts with atmospheric oxygen to form a thin, tough surface layer of alumina (aluminium oxide) which acts as a barrier to corrosion of the copper-rich alloy. The addition of tin can improve corrosion resistance.

Another notable property of aluminium bronzes are their biostatic effects.  The copper component of the alloy prevents colonization by marine organisms including algae, lichens, barnacles, and mussels, and therefore can be preferable to stainless steel or other non-cupric alloys in applications where such colonization would be unwanted.

Aluminium bronzes tend to have a golden color.

Applications

Aluminium bronzes are most commonly used in applications where their resistance to corrosion makes them preferable to other engineering materials.  These applications include plain bearings and landing gear components on aircraft, guitar strings, valve components, engine components (especially for seagoing ships), underwater fastenings in naval architecture, and ship propellers.  Aluminium bronze is also used to fulfil the ATEX directive for Zones 1, 2, 21, and 22. The attractive gold-toned coloration of aluminium bronzes has also led to their use in jewellery.

Aluminium bronzes are in the highest demand from the following industries and areas:

General sea water-related service
Water supply
Oil and petrochemical industries (i.e. tools for use in non-sparking environments)
Specialised anti-corrosive applications
Certain structural retrofit building applications

Aluminium bronze can be welded using the MIG welding technique with an aluminium bronze core and pure argon gas.

Aluminium bronze is used to replace gold for the casting of dental crowns. The alloys used are chemically inert and have the appearance of gold.

Italy pioneered the use for coinage of an aluminium-bronze alloy called bronzital (literally "Italian bronze") in its 5- and 10-centesimi from 1939. Its alloy was finalized in 1967 to 92% copper, 6% aluminium, and 2% nickel, and was since used in the 20, 200 and 500 Italian Lira coins until 2001. Bronzital has since been used for the Australian and New Zealand 1- and 2-dollar coins, the pre-2009 Mexican 20- and 50-centavo coins, the inner cores of the bi-metallic Mexican 1-, 2- and 5-peso coins, the pre-2017 Philippine 10-peso coin, the Canadian 2 dollar coin (a.k.a. the 'toonie'), and the outer rings of the Mexican 10-, 20-, 50- and 100-peso coins.

Nordic gold, composed of 89% copper, 5% aluminium, 5% zinc, and 1% tin, is a more recently developed aluminium-bronze alloy for coinage. It was first used for the Swedish 10-kronor coin in 1991, and became widespread after the introduction of Nordic gold 10, 20 and 50-cent Euro coins in 2002.

References

External links

Copper Development Association. "Publication Number 80: Aluminium Bronze Alloys Corrosion Resistance Guide", PDF . Retrieved April 9, 2014.
Copper Development Association. "Publication Number 82: Aluminium Bronze Alloys Technical Data". Retrieved April 9, 2014

Bronze
Copper alloys
Aluminium–copper alloys